Federico Ramiro Mor (born December 12, 1962 in Madrid, Spain) is a retired basketball player. He played 5 for the Spain national team.

Clubs
1979–81: Real Madrid
1981–85: CB OAR Ferrol
1985–87: Cajamadrid
1987–88: Saski Baskonia
1988–91: CB Málaga
1991–94: CB Valladolid
1994–96: CB Salamanca

Awards
Euroleague (1): 1979-80
Liga ACB (1): 1979-80
Copa del Rey (1): 1979-80
Intercontinental Cup (1): 1981

References
 ACB profile 

1962 births
Living people
Spanish men's basketball players
Liga ACB players
Real Madrid Baloncesto players
Saski Baskonia players
Baloncesto Málaga players
CB Valladolid players
Point guards
Basketball players from Madrid